Bernard Schlichting (January 2, 1838 – January 3, 1884) was a member of the Wisconsin State Assembly. During the American Civil War, he originally enlisted with the 9th Michigan Volunteer Infantry Regiment of the Union Army. Later, he was commissioned captain of Company C, 45th Wisconsin Infantry Regiment. He died suddenly on January 3, 1884, in Milwaukee, Wisconsin.

Assembly career
Schlichting was a member of the Assembly during the 1875 session. He was a Republican.

References

People from Sheboygan County, Wisconsin
Politicians from Milwaukee
Republican Party members of the Wisconsin State Assembly
People of Michigan in the American Civil War
People of Wisconsin in the American Civil War
Union Army officers
Union Army soldiers
1838 births
1884 deaths
19th-century American politicians